Sheikh Farhan al-Saadi (circa 1862 – 27 November 1937) was born in the village al-Mazar near Jenin, Palestine. He participated in national conferences and demonstrations against the British Mandate of Palestine, and in the 1929 Palestine riots. He is thought to have been the first to use a weapon during the 1936 revolt.

Sa'adi was at one point imprisoned by the British authorities. When he was released from prison, he moved to Haifa where he met Sheikh Izz al-Din al-Qassam and joined his organisation. On 15 April 1936, a group called Ikhwan al-Qassam under al-Sa'di's leadership ambushed a bus on the Nablus-Tulkarm road. Two Jewish passengers were taken off the bus and fatally shot. This incident is seen as the starting point of the 1936–1939 Arab Revolt. For the many operations against the British, he was sentenced to death. He was executed on 27 November 1937, at the age of 75 during the Ramadan fast.

References

1937 deaths
People from Jenin Governorate
1856 births
People executed by Mandatory Palestine by hanging
Rebel commanders of the 1936–1939 Arab revolt in Palestine
Palestinian nationalists